Bobèche can mean different things:

 Bobèche is a type of candlestick holder.
 Bobèche is the name of a particular French clown.